Omar Bazán Flores (born 24 March 1976) is a Mexican politician affiliated with the Institutional Revolutionary Party (PRI). As of 2014 he served as Deputy of the LVII and LIX Legislatures of the Mexican Congress as a plurinominal representative replacing José Reyes Baeza Terrazas.

References

1976 births
Living people
People from Chihuahua City
Members of the Chamber of Deputies (Mexico)
Institutional Revolutionary Party politicians
Deputies of the LIX Legislature of Mexico